Cú Connacht Ua Dálaigh, (a.k.a. Cu Chonnacht na Sgoile, "Cu Connacht of the school"), died 1139.

Overview
Cú Connacht was a member of the Ó Dálaigh bardic family, originally from County Westmeath. Branches of the family would settle in all four provinces of Ireland. His is the earliest recorded use of the name Ó Dálaigh.

Cú Connacht died at the monastery of Clonard in 1139. The Irish annals accord him "The first ollamh of poetry in all Ireland." It further states that He was of Leacain in Mide.

Family Tree
In the introduction to The Tribes of Ireland by Aonghus Ruadh na nAor Ó Dálaigh, the editors give the following family tree.

  Adhamh, a quo Corca Adhamh of County Westmeath
  |
  |
  Corc
  |
  |
  Fachtna
  |
  |
  Dalach, a quo Ua Dálaigh
  |
  |
  Gilla Coimhdheadh
  |
  |
  Tadhg ua Dálaigh
  |
  |
  Muireadhach Ua Dálaigh
  |
  |
  Dalach Ua Dálaigh
  |
  |
  Cú Connacht Ua Dálaigh, died 1139.
  |
  |
  Tadhg Doichleach Ua Dálaigh, died 1181.
  |
  |
  Aonghus Ó Dálaigh, the common ancestor of all the O'Dalys extant
  |
  |___
  |                   |                    |                        |                |           |
  |                   |                    |                        |                |           |
  Cearbhall Fionn  Donnchadh Mor   Cormac na Casbhairne   Muireadhach Albanach  Gilla na Naemh  Tadhg
  |                   |                                                            (issue)       |
  |                   |                                                                          |
  |                   |                                                                          |
 Ua Dálaigh Fionn   Ua Dálaigh                                                              Ua Dálaigh
 of Duhallow        of Finvarra                                                             of Breifne
 Co. Cork.          Co. Clare
                    and Dunsandle
                    Co. Galway

See also
 Máel Íosa Ua Dálaigh, died 1185
 Donnchadh Mór Ó Dálaigh, died 1244
 Muireadhach Albanach, alive 1228
 Gofraidh Fionn Ó Dálaigh, died 1387
 Aonghus Fionn Ó Dálaigh, died 1570
 Lochlann Óg Ó Dálaigh, fl. c. 1610
 Cearbhall Óg Ó Dálaigh, fl. 1630

External links
 http://www.ucc.ie/celt/published/T100005B/
 https://books.google.com/books?id=TTBgAAAAMAAJ&printsec=frontcover&dq=the+tribes+of+ireland,+aengus+o%27daly&source=bl&ots=VluldvIGaA&sig=mjvcGp_XGrkfMl7cmDT0dyrC9Jc&hl=en&ei=X8WpTdLHIc6zhAf1z-HMCQ&sa=X&oi=book_result&ct=result&resnum=1&ved=0CBcQ6AEwAA#v=onepage&q&f=false

People from County Westmeath
12th-century Irish poets
Medieval Irish poets
12th-century Irish writers
1139 deaths
Year of birth unknown
Irish lords
Irish male poets
Irish-language writers